The Collen C. Campbell House is a historic house in Barnstable, Massachusetts.  The -story Cape style cottage was built c. 1920, and is distinctive as the only house of the period to be converted to commercial use without compromising its historic character.  The only significant alteration from its original Arts and Crafts styling is the addition of larger commercial windows flanking the center entry.

The house was listed on the National Register of Historic Places in 1987.

See also
National Register of Historic Places listings in Barnstable County, Massachusetts

References

Houses in Barnstable, Massachusetts
National Register of Historic Places in Barnstable, Massachusetts
Houses on the National Register of Historic Places in Barnstable County, Massachusetts